Jorge Sánchez (born 9 February 1977) is an Olympic backstroke swimmer from Spain. He swam for Spain at the:
Olympics: 2004
World Championships: 1998, 2003
Mediterranean Games: 2001
European Championships: 1997
Short Course Europeans: 1998

References

1977 births
Living people
Spanish male backstroke swimmers
Olympic swimmers of Spain
Swimmers at the 2004 Summer Olympics
Mediterranean Games bronze medalists for Spain
Mediterranean Games medalists in swimming
Swimmers at the 2001 Mediterranean Games